The Rivers State gubernatorial election took place on 9 March 2019, concurrently with various other Nigerian state level elections. A rerun of the vote was held in Abua–Odual, Ahoada West, Gokana and Opobo–Nkoro on 13 April. One-term incumbent Governor Ezenwo Nyesom Wike of the People's Democratic Party was eligible to run for re-election. He won in 2015 with 87.77% of the vote.

Vote counting after the elections was suspended after widespread violence in the state. On 3 April, the INEC declared that incumbent Wike won re-election, as the total number of voters in areas where elections were cancelled or did not hold was not enough to give his opponent victory.

Background
Ezenwo Nyesom Wike previously served as Minister of State for Education prior to becoming governor. He was also Chairman of the 2016 PDP National Convention Committee. Wike considered running for a second term as the state's chief executive, and 51 years old at the time of the election in 2019.

There had been reports of a rift between members of the All Progressives Congress Dakuku Peterside and Ibim Semenitari. The state party chairman, Davies Ikanya has, however, denied this. In 2017, Transportation Minister Chibuike Amaechi got involved in a dispute with party members, after he declared billionaire businessman Tonye Cole as his choice for the All Progressives Congress nomination for governor.

On 22 May 2017, Senate minority leader and former governor Godswill Akpabio announced that he would support a second term for Governor Wike in the Brick House. Former Senate President David Mark and Deputy Senate President Ike Ekweremadu also voiced their endorsement of the incumbent governor to run for reelection.

Election

See also
 2015 Rivers State gubernatorial election
 Elections in Rivers State

References

Rivers State
Rivers State gubernatorial elections
Election and referendum articles with incomplete results
March 2019 events in Nigeria
2019 Rivers State elections
Governorship of Ezenwo Nyesom Wike
April 2019 events in Africa